Raoul Martial "Rod" Dedeaux (February 17, 1914 – January 5, 2006) was an American college baseball coach who compiled what is widely recognized as among the greatest records of any coach in the sport's amateur history.

Dedeaux was the head baseball coach at the University of Southern California (USC) in Los Angeles for 45 seasons, and retired at age 72 in 1986. His teams won 11 national titles (College World Series), including a record five straight (1970–1974), and 28 conference championships. Dedeaux was named Coach of the Year six times by the Collegiate Baseball Coaches Association and was inducted into its Hall of Fame in 1970. He was named "Coach of the Century" by Collegiate Baseball magazine  and was one of ten initial inductees to the College Baseball Hall of Fame.

Early life
Born in New Orleans, Louisiana, Dedeaux moved to Los Angeles and graduated from Hollywood High School in 1931. He played baseball at the University of Southern California for three seasons. Dedeaux then played professional baseball briefly in 1935, appearing in two games as a shortstop for the Brooklyn Dodgers late in the season. The following year while playing for Dayton in the Mid-Atlantic League, he cracked a vertebra while swinging in cold weather and his playing career ended. He then turned to coaching in the semi-pro and amateur ranks.

Career
Dedeaux invested $500 to start a trucking firm, Dart (Dedeaux Automotive Repair and Transit) Enterprises, which he built into a successful regional business. Upon Barry's return in 1946, they served as co-coaches with Dedeaux running the team each year until Barry finished the basketball season. USC won its first national title in 1948, over Yale, captained by first baseman George H. W. Bush. The finals were held at Hyames Field in Kalamazoo, Michigan, settled by a 9–2 win in the third and deciding game.

Following Barry's death in September 1950, Dedeaux became the sole coach and proceeded to build on his early success to establish the strongest program in collegiate baseball. Prior to his retirement in June , Dedeaux's teams won ten additional College World Series titles in Omaha, including five straight (1970–74) and six in seven years. No other coach had won more than three titles until 1997.

At USC, Dedeaux coached dozens of future major leaguers, including Ron Fairly, Don Buford, Tom Seaver, Dave Kingman, Roy Smalley, Fred Lynn, Steve Kemp, Mark McGwire, and Randy Johnson. Throughout his USC career, he accepted a nominal salary of just $1 per year since his trucking business supplied him with a substantial income. He turned down numerous offers of major league coaching positions, including invitations from Los Angeles Dodgers manager Tommy Lasorda to join his staff, always rejecting them due to his preference for the college game and his desire to remain close to his family.

He retired as the winningest coach in college baseball history with a record of 1,332–571–11, and for the rest of his life remained an honored annual presence at the College World Series in Omaha. At the 1999 edition, the 50th played in Omaha, he was given a key to the city by the mayor and a one-minute standing ovation by the fans at Rosenblatt Stadium. He was inducted into the American Baseball Coaches Association's Hall of Fame in 1970, and in 1999 was named the Coach of the Century by Collegiate Baseball magazine.

USC played its home games at Bovard Field through 1973, and Dedeaux became known as "The Houdini of Bovard" for the come-from-behind home-field wins by the Trojans. A new baseball field named Dedeaux Field opened in 1974, named in honor of the active head coach.

Olympics
Dedeaux was the head coach of the United States baseball teams at the 1964 Summer Olympics in Tokyo and the 1984 Summer Olympics in Los Angeles, where baseball was contested both times as a demonstration sport. The 1964 team played one game as part of the Olympic program, defeating a  Japanese amateur all-star team, while the 1984 team finished second in a field of eight teams, winning its first four games and losing to Japan in the final game of the tournament.

Films
Dedeaux also served as the baseball coach and consultant for actors and ballplayers on the 1989 film Field of Dreams.While Dedeaux was critical of the "phoniness that was in baseball movies," an opinion which he acquired while working as an extra in the 1948 film The Babe Ruth Story, he accepted the task after reading the original novel Shoeless Joe and brought Buford along to help him coach the cast. Phil Alden Robinson, who directed the film, said the following about Dedeaux:

All of the ballplayers in the movie were prepped for the film by Rod Dedeaux. He coached at USC for many years, and is a wonderful man, very full of life, energetic, very supportive, just really was very giving of himself and cheerful all the time, was a great spirit to have around. And one day, we were in between setups and I said, 'Hey, coach, what position did you play?' He said, 'I was a shortstop.' I said, 'Really, could you — were you good?' He got very quiet, and he said, 'I could field the ball.' I said, 'Could you hit?' He said, 'I could hit the ball.' And he was strangely quiet. And I said to him, 'Well, how come you never played in the majors?' And he said, 'I did.' I said, 'Really?' [Dedeaux said] 'Yes, in 1930-something.' I forget what year he said. He was the starting shortstop for the Brooklyn Dodgers. He played one game, broke his back and that was the end of his career.And I just blanched. I said, 'My God, you're Doc Graham.' He said, 'That's right.' And I said, 'Do you ever think about, "gee, the career I might've had."' And he said, 'Every day.' He said it very quietly. It was very out of character for him and I was so touched by that. And I did look him up in the Baseball Encyclopedia: He did go, I think, 1-for-4 with an RBI. That was his lifetime stats. So having him be the man who trained all these fellows, including the kid who plays Doc Graham, was very meaningful to me and I know it was to him, too. It was great to have him around. I think about that often, about what that must have been like, to be good enough to start with a Major League team and for one unlucky moment, not be able to do — the rest of your life takes another turn. What he did with that is, he put all of that emotion — which could have gone into bitterness or regret — into being a phenomenal coach. He sent more people to the majors than, I think, anyboby else in college history. He's an amazing man.

Personal
Dedeaux was married to the former Helen L. Jones (1915–2007) for 66 years and they had four children.

Death and legacy
Dedeaux died in early  at age 91 at Glendale Adventist Medical Center in Glendale, of complications from a stroke five weeks earlier. Six months later on July 4, he was one of ten in the first class inducted into the College Baseball Hall of Fame. Dedeaux was also inducted in the inaugural class of the Omaha College Baseball Hall of Fame in 2013, and a statue of him was unveiled at Dedeaux Field on the USC campus in 2014.

Dedeaux was inducted into the Baseball Reliquary's Shrine of the Eternals in 2005.

Dedeaux and his wife Helen are buried in Los Angeles at Forest Lawn Memorial Park in Hollywood Hills.

Head coaching record

See also

 List of college baseball coaches with 1,100 wins

References

External links

 College Baseball Hall of Fame
 

1914 births
2006 deaths
Baseball players from Los Angeles
Brooklyn Dodgers players
Burials at Forest Lawn Memorial Park (Hollywood Hills)
National College Baseball Hall of Fame inductees
Dayton Ducks players
Hazleton Mountaineers players
Hollywood Stars players
Major League Baseball shortstops
New York Yankees scouts
Olympic baseball managers
San Diego Padres (minor league) players
Tacoma Tigers players
USC Trojans baseball coaches
USC Trojans baseball players
Baseball players from New Orleans
Hollywood High School alumni